Graham, Anderson, Probst & White (GAP&W) was a Chicago architectural firm that was founded in 1912 as Graham, Burnham & Co. This firm was the successor to D. H. Burnham & Co. through Daniel Burnham's surviving partner, Ernest R. Graham, and Burnham's sons, Hubert Burnham and Daniel Burnham Jr. In 1917, the Burnhams left to form their own practice, which eventually became Burnham Brothers, and Graham and the remaining members of Graham, Burnham & Co. – Graham, (William) Peirce Anderson, Edward Mathias Probst, and Howard Judson White – formed the resulting practice. The firm also employed Victor Andre Matteson.

Background
Graham, Anderson, Probst & White was the largest architectural firm under one roof during the first half of the twentieth century. The firm's importance to Chicago's architectural legacy cannot be overstated, nor can its connection to Burnham.

The firm was headquartered in Burnham's own Railway Exchange Building. In part from its connection to Burnham, the firm captured the majority of the big commissions from 1912 to 1936, including such iconic works as the Wrigley Building, Merchandise Mart, Field Museum, Shedd Aquarium, Civic Opera House, and the former central Chicago post office. Its only close rival was the equally prolific Holabird and Root.

GAP&W also created the iconic Terminal Tower in Cleveland and Federal Reserve Bank in Kansas City.

Anderson died in 1924, with Graham and White following just weeks apart in 1936. Surviving partner Edward M. Probst took over the firm, assisted by his sons Marvin Probst and Edward E. Probst.

After Mr. Probst's death in 1942, son Marvin G. Probst took over as firm president. Edward E. Probst left the firm about 1947. Just prior to Marvin Probst's death in 1970, the firm was sold to an employee, William R. Surman. From 1970 to 1993 William Surman was president of the firm. After his death in 1993, the practice was run by his son Robert Surman till the firm closed its doors in the fall of 2006.

Early on, Graham, Anderson, Probst & White became known for its classical taste and the elegance of its Beaux-Arts-inspired output, which Louis Sullivan decried as a stylistic throwback but which nonetheless withstood multiple generations of critics. Those early buildings are still popular favorites today. However, starting in 1923 with the firm's plans for the Merchandise Mart and the Straus Building, the practice soon began to move beyond the Beaux-Arts influence of Burnham and the City Beautiful movement to the bolder, starker Art Deco style with its streamlined forms. The firm's ultimate expression of the Art Deco style was found in its design of the 1931 Field Building (later known as the La Salle Bank Building), which was a commission from the estate of department store magnate Marshall Field. It was matched that year by Holabird and Root's equally stunning Chicago Board of Trade Building. After 1931, GAP&W for the most part stopped referencing the Beaux-Arts style.

Buildings
 Field Museum of Natural History (D.H. Burnham & Co., 1909–12; Graham, Burnham & Co., 1912–17; GAP&W, 1917–20)
 Conway Building, 1913 (D.H. Burnham & Co. and Graham, Burnham & Co.)
 Continental and Commercial Bank Building, 1914 (as Graham, Burnham & Co.)
 Marshall Field & Co. Annex and northeast section of main store, 1914 (as Graham, Burnham & Co.)
 Union Station (Chicago), 225 South Canal Street, 1913-25 (begun as Graham, Burnham & Co.)
 Kimball Building (a.k.a. DePaul University Lewis Center), 1917
 Wrigley Building, 1919–1925
 Federal Reserve Bank of Chicago Building, 1922
 Butler Brothers Warehouse Building, 1922
 7 E. Redwood Ave, Baltimore MD (fmr Citizens National Bank of Baltimore Building, a.k.a. Union Citizens National Bank, 1922)
 Belknap Hardware and Manufacturing Building (101-23 East Main Street, Louisville, KY - now known as Waterside Building), 1923
 Straus Building (a.k.a. Continental National Insurance Building), 1923–24
 Merchandise Mart, 1923–31
 Illinois Merchants Bank Building (a.k.a. Continental Illinois Bank Building), 1924
 Chesapeake & Ohio Railway Passenger and Freight Stations, Carter Avenue between 10th and 11th Streets, Ashland, Kentucky, 1925
 John G. Shedd Aquarium, 1925–1931
 Pittsfield Building, 1926–1927
 State Line Generating Plant, 1926–29
 Terminal Tower, Public Square, Cleveland, 1926-1930
 Builders Building (a.k.a. 222 N. La Salle St.), 1927
 208 W. Washington St., Chicago (a.k.a. Concord City Centre), 1927
 Civic Opera House (Chicago), 1927–1929
 30th Street Station, Philadelphia, 1927-1933
 Insurance Exchange Building, south section, 1928
 State Bank of Chicago Building, 1928
 Museum of Science and Industry (Chicago) reconstruction, 1928–1940
 Foreman State National Bank Building, 1930
 Suburban Station, 16th Street at John Fitzgerald Kennedy Boulevard, Philadelphia, 1930
 Chicago, Burlington & Quincy Railroad Depot, South 10th Street, Omaha, Nebraska, renovation 1930
 Field Building (a.k.a. La Salle National Bank Building), 1931
 Mayflower Manor Apartments, Akron, 1931
 La Rabida Children's Hospital and Research Center, 1931
 U.S. Post Office Central Office, Chicago, 1932
 Chicago Historical Society Building, 1932
 Hurley Hall, University of Notre Dame, 1932
 Reyniers Life Building, University of Notre Dame, 1947
 Edens Plaza, Wilmette, Illinois, 1956
 Morton Salt Headquarters, 1956–61
 American Dental Association Building, 1965
 County Bank and Trust Co. Building, Blue Island, IL, 1965 
 Hayes-Haley Hall, University of Notre Dame, 1968
 CNA Center, Chicago, 1972–1973
 Motorola World Headquarters, Schaumburg, IL 1973
 Illinois State Library, Springfield, IL 1990 
 Loyola University Chicago, Administrative Offices, Forest Park, IL 1991
 2 East Erie, Chicago, IL 2002
 Bethlehem Steel General Office Building (Former Headquarters until Martin Tower was built in the 1970s), Bethlehem, PA 1916. Currently vacant.

Architectural sculpture
Like most of the other prominent architectural firms of the early 20th Century, GAP&W frequently used sculpture to decorate its building designs.  As was the custom of the era GAP&W had specific artists that they preferred to work with.  One in particular was New Yorker Henry Hering, who created the sculptured pediment for the Civic Opera House; a variety of details for the Field Museum of Natural History, including a variation on the Erectheum porch; and the allegorical figures Day and Night for the Great Hall of the Chicago's Union Station.  As the century progressed, the firm moved away from the classical style favored by Hering and used for the firm's earlier Beaux Arts buildings to more contemporary art deco styled work, such as that attributed to sculptor Frank Jirouch on Cleveland's Midland Building.

Gallery

References

Bach, Ira, Chicago On Foot: Walking Tours of Chicago's Architecture, Rand McNally & Company, Chicago  1979
Bach, Ira, editor,  Chicago's Famous Buildings, University of Chicago Press, Chicago, Illinois, 1980
Chappell, Sally Kitt, Transforming Tradition: Architecture and Planning of Graham, Anderson, Probst and White, 1912–1936, University of Chicago Press, Chicago IL  1992

External links 

 Graham Foundation
 Artnet profile

Design companies established in 1912
1912 establishments in Illinois
American railway architects
Defunct architecture firms based in Chicago